Vụ Bản is a rural district of Nam Định province in the Red River Delta region of Vietnam. As of 2003 the district had a population of 130,672. The district covers an area of 148 km2. The district capital lies at Gôi. The district includes the Vân Cát temple. During the 1920s the area was administered by the Vụ Bản district mandarin.

References

Districts of Nam Định province